Frank Joseph "Lefty" Fanovich (January 11, 1923 – August 27, 2011) was an American Major League Baseball pitcher. The left-hander played for the Cincinnati Reds during the  season and the Philadelphia Athletics during the  season. He allowed 106 hits in 105 innings pitched, with 65 bases on balls and 64 strikeouts.

External links

1923 births
2011 deaths
Atlanta Crackers players
Cincinnati Reds players
Danville Leafs players
Major League Baseball pitchers
Minneapolis Millers (baseball) players
Ogdensburg Maples players
Ottawa A's players
Ottawa Giants players
Philadelphia Athletics players
Richmond Virginians (minor league) players
San Antonio Missions players
Savannah Indians players
Syracuse Chiefs players
Trenton Giants players
Watertown Athletics players
Baseball players from New York City